There are various lists of government and military acronyms, expressions and slang:

 List of military slang terms
 List of established military terms
 Glossary of military abbreviations

by country
 Grande Armée slang (France of the Napoleonic Era)
 Glossary of German military terms (Germany)
 List of Philippine government and military acronyms

United States / American English
 List of U.S. government and military acronyms
 List of United States Marine Corps acronyms and expressions
 List of U.S. Navy acronyms and expressions
 List of U.S. Air Force acronyms and expressions
 Nicknames of United States Army divisions

See also